The 1912–13 Hong Kong First Division League season was the 5th since its establishment.

League table

References
1912–13 Hong Kong First Division (RSSSF)

1912-13
1912–13 domestic association football leagues
1912 in Hong Kong
1913 in Hong Kong